Gangil-dong is a dong, neighbourhood of Gangdong-gu in Seoul, South Korea.

Gangil-dong is located on the easternmost side of Seoul. Originally a small farming village where development was prohibited due to its location at Seoul's greenbelt, the city's new developments projects in the 21st century lead to a complete transformation of this neighbourhood. It is now home to the Gangil River Park multi-rise apartment complexes with a view into the Han River, the Gangil High-Tech Business Center, a brand new library and a new four-lane bridge connecting it to Sangil-dong.

See also 
Administrative divisions of South Korea

References

External links
Gangdong-gu official website
Gangdong-gu map at the Gangdong-gu official website
 The Gangil & Godeok 2-dong Resident office

Neighbourhoods of Gangdong District